Ombrone was a department of the First French Empire in modern-day Italy. It was named after the river Ombrone. It was formed in 1808, when the Kingdom of Etruria (formerly the Grand Duchy of Tuscany) was annexed directly to France. Its capital was Siena.

The department was disbanded after the defeat of Napoleon in 1814. At the Congress of Vienna, the Grand Duchy of Tuscany was restored to its previous Habsburg-Lorraine prince, Ferdinand III. Its territory is now divided between the Italian provinces of Siena, Arezzo and Grosseto.

Subdivisions
The department was subdivided into the following arrondissements and cantons (situation in 1812):

 Siena, cantons: Bucine, Colle, Chiusdino, Poggibonsi, Radda, Radicondoli, Rapolano, Siena (2 cantons) and Sovicille.
 Grosseto, cantons: Arcidosso, Campagnatico, Santa Fiora, Isola del Giglio, Grosseto, Massa, Manciano, Orbetello, Pitigliano, Roccastrada and Scansano.
 Montepulciano, cantons: Abbadia San Salvatore, Asinalunga, Chiusi, Montalcino, Montepulciano, Pienza and Sarteano.

Its population in 1812 was 189,307, and its area was 774,897 hectares.

References

See also
Tuscany
History of Tuscany
Rulers of Tuscany

Former departments of France in Italy
History of Siena
History of Tuscany
1808 establishments in the First French Empire
1808 establishments in Italy
1814 disestablishments in Italy
1800s in the Grand Duchy of Tuscany
1810s in the Grand Duchy of Tuscany